Droszków may refer to the following places in Poland:
Droszków, Lower Silesian Voivodeship (south-west Poland)
Droszków, Lubusz Voivodeship (west Poland)